The Saudi Data and AI Authority (SDAIA) is a government agency in Saudi Arabia that was established by a royal decree on 30 August 2019. The authority has three other bodies linked to it. Two of which were also created by a royal decree on the same day. These two bodies are a center called "The National Centre for Artificial Intelligence" and an office called "The National Data Management Office." The third is the National Information Center, which is an existing entity.

The Saudi Data and AI Authority (SDAIA) celebrated the launch of its brand identity at an event held at the Ritz Carlton Hotel on 4 March 2020, in Riyadh under the theme, 'Data is the Oil of the 21st Century'.

Structure 
The authority is directly linked to the Prime Minister and will be governed by a board of directors chaired by the Deputy Prime Minister.

References 

2019 establishments in Saudi Arabia
Government agencies of Saudi Arabia